Monkwearmouth Railway Bridge (officially Monkwearmouth Bridge, also called Wearmouth Railway Bridge or Sunderland Railway Bridge) is a railway bridge built in 1879, crossing the River Wear at Sunderland and Monkwearmouth. The bridge lies adjacent to and upstream of the Wearmouth Road Bridge.

Originally built as part of the Monkwearmouth Junction Line, it provided the first direct railway link between Newcastle and Sunderland. The bridge is now used by Tyne and Wear Metro and Durham Coast Line services.

History and design

The bridge was built as part of the infrastructure for the Monkwearmouth Junction Line, which opened in 1879; a connecting line across the River Wear to link line of the former Brandling Junction Railway at Monkwearmouth to the south bank at Sunderland and the line of the former Durham and Sunderland Railway.

The bridge was designed by T. E. Harrison: it consisted of a  main span, an iron bowstring bridge, constructed from box girders connected by a  Vierendeel truss with curved corner strengthening to create elliptical voids in the bracing. At either end of the bridge were three  span masonry arches. Hawks, Crawshay and Sons built the ironwork, John Waddell was contractor for the stonework. At the time of its construction it was claimed to be the largest hogsback iron bridge in the world.

The structure was grade II listed in 1978, planning consent was required for alterations to the structure circa 2000 for works relating to Metro construction: for the installation of overhead line electrification; and for the construction of a station (St Peter's Metro station), constructed on the northern approach viaduct of the bridge. In 2007 the bridge underwent repairs and strengthening, including the installation of 45 new transverse beams.

Use
The bridge and railway allowed trains to run directly from Newcastle to Hartlepool, by creating a through line from Newcastle to Sunderland.

Since 2002, the bridge has also carried the Tyne and Wear Metro. It is part of the modern (2012) Durham Coast Line.

References

External links

Railway bridges in Tyne and Wear
Bridges across the River Wear
Bridges completed in 1879
Tied arch bridges
Transport in the City of Sunderland
Tyne and Wear Metro
Truss bridges
Vierendeel truss bridges
Sunderland